The Music Master was a theatrical play written by Charles Klein, and produced and directed by David Belasco.

Background
The three-act comedy-drama opened at the Belasco Theatre in New York on September 26, 1904. It ran for 124 performances before it was moved to the Bijou Theatre where it ran for another 511 performances over that and the next two seasons (taking summers off), before going on tour. David Warfield originated the title role, Anton Von Barwig, and continued playing it in revivals and on tour for two decades. William Furst composed the play's incidental music. It was adapted into the filmThe Music Master.

References

Bibliography
Mantle, Burns and Garrison P. Sherwood, eds., The Best Plays of 1899-1909, Philadelphia, The Blakiston Company, 1947.
The Music Master clipping/theatrical program folder held by the Billy Rose Theatre Division, New York Public Library for the Performing Arts.

Broadway plays
1904 plays